Johnny Winter And is the fourth studio album by Texas blues guitarist Johnny Winter, released in 1970. Besides Winter, the group included guitarist Rick Derringer, bassist Randy Jo Hobbs and drummer Randy Zehringer, all former members of the McCoys. This was the first album released with Rick Derringer as a sideman. It was also the name of his band for a short time.

September 12, 2018, Sony Japan released a 13-song remastered version with 2 bonus cuts.

Track listing
 "Guess I'll Go Away" (Johnny Winter) (3:28)
 "Ain't That a Kindness" (Mark Klingman) (3:29)
 "No Time to Live" (Jim Capaldi, Steve Winwood) (4:36)
 "Rock and Roll, Hoochie Koo" (Rick Derringer) (3:31) 
 "Am I Here?" (Randy Zehringer) (3:24)
 "Look Up" (Derringer) (3:34)
 "Prodigal Son" (Winter) (4:18)
 "On the Limb" (Derringer) (3:36)
 "Let the Music Play" (Allan Nicholls, Otis Stephens) (3:15)
 "Nothing Left" (Winter) (3:30)
 "Funky Music" (Derringer) (4:55)

2018 Remastered Reissue with Bonus Tracks
 "Guess I'll Go Away" (Live) (4:40)
 "Rock and Roll, Hoochie Koo" (Live) (4:56)

Personnel
Johnny Winter And
Johnny Winter – vocals, guitar
Rick Derringer – vocals, guitar
Randy Jo Hobbs – vocals, bass
Randy Zehringer – drums
Production
Produced by Johnny Winter and Rick Derringer
Production assistants: Roy Segal, Edgar Winter
Engineering: Roy Segal
Photography: Norman Seeff
Design: Lloyd Ziff

References

External links
The Johnny Winter Story

1970 albums
Johnny Winter albums
Columbia Records albums
Albums produced by Johnny Winter